Football Manager 2013 (often abbreviated to FM13) is a 2012 football management simulation video game developed by Sports Interactive and published by Sega. It was released on Microsoft Windows and OS X on 2 November 2012. Football Manager Handheld 2013 was subsequently published for PlayStation Portable on 30 November, and for iOS and Android on 13 December.

Gameplay

FM13 features similar gameplay to that of the Football Manager series. Gameplay consists of taking charge of a professional association football team, as the team manager. Players can sign football players to contracts, manage finances for the club, and give team talks to players. FM13 is a simulation of real world management, with the player being judged on various factors by the club's AI owners and board.

FM13 includes a quicker mode of play, called "Football Manager Classic". This new mode allow gamers to complete a season in less time than the normal game mode. It retains the 3D match engine and player/staff database, but simplifies the way players manage their club and allows them to focus on selected key areas to build success. A player can complete a season in approximately seven hours of gameplay.

Challenges 
FM13 also includes a number of pre-set challenges, offering players scenarios designed to test their management skills over a set period of time - usually half a season. The challenges replicate a variety of real world circumstances. On 19 December 2012, two new challenges were added to the in-game store.

Release 
On 6 September 2012, FM13 was officially announced via a mock press conference video on Sports Interactive's YouTube channel. It was confirmed the game would include over 900 new features, including a new mode called "Football Manager Classic". Release was slated as prior to the Christmas holiday season. On 27 September, it was announced that the game would be released at midnight on 2 November.

On 18 October 2012, a fully playable beta version was provided to customers who pre-ordered either the digital version (via Steam) or physical versions (from selected retailers). Save data from the beta was compatible with the final version. On 26 October 2012, a demo was made available for the game.

Reception 

FM13 has received very positive reviews, including the highest ever Metacritic score for a Football Manager game, with a score of 86/100.

Sales
As of 31 March 2013, the game had sold 940,000 copies in the US and Europe.

References

External links 
 
 Official forum

2012 video games
2013
MacOS games
Video games developed in the United Kingdom
Windows games
IOS games
Android (operating system) games
PlayStation Portable games
La Liga licensed video games